The Silent Mill or The Story of the Silent Mill (German: Die Geschichte der stillen Mühle) is a 1914 German silent drama film directed by Richard Oswald and starring Alfred Abel, Ferdinand Bonn and Robert Valberg.

The film's sets were designed by the art director Hermann Warm. It was shot at the Tempelhof Studios.

Cast 
 Alfred Abel as Johann 
 Ferdinand Bonn as Mühlknecht David 
 Robert Valberg as Martin 
 Leontine Kühnberg as Gertrude - Martin's Frau 
 Otto Reinwald
 Friedrich Kühne

References

Bibliography
 Bock, Hans-Michael & Bergfelder, Tim. The Concise CineGraph. Encyclopedia of German Cinema. Berghahn Books, 2009.

External links

1914 films
Films of the German Empire
German silent feature films
Films directed by Richard Oswald
German black-and-white films
Films shot at Tempelhof Studios
1914 drama films
German drama films
Films based on works by Hermann Sudermann
Films based on German novels
Silent drama films
1910s German films